Vyry (Ukrainian: Вири) is a railway station in Bilany, Sumy Oblast, Ukraine. The station is on the Sumy Directorate of Southern Railways on the Bilopillya-Basy line.

Passenger service

Both passenger and suburban trains stop at Vyry station.

Notes

 Tariff Guide No. 4. Book 1 (as of 05/15/2021) (Russian) Archived 05/15/2021.
 Arkhangelsky A.S., Arkhangelsky V.A. in two books. - M.: Transport, 1981. (rus.)

References

External links

Vyry on railwayz.info
Passenger train schedule
Suburban train schedule

Railway stations in Sumy Oblast
Sumy
Buildings and structures in Sumy Oblast